Full Grown is a UK company that grows trees into chairs, sculptures, lamps, mirror frames and tables. It was co-founded by Gavin Munro in 2005.

History
In 2005 with a £5,000 investment Gavin Munro started the process of experimentation with growing chairs. The original idea came from Gavin's childhood memory of an overgrown bonsai that looked like a small throne. The inspiration lead to growing trees into chairs, sculptures, lamps, mirror frames and tables.

The idea of growing trees for 50 years then cut them into small pieces glue together in ways that can only ever fall apart didn't seem to make much sense. Better to grow the trees into one solid piece. For example, a chair or a light shade. Ideally the tree would have the ability to re-shoot and in this way yield furniture the way an apple tree in an orchard does.
 
Working together with his wife Alice Munro. The concept is to train young trees to grow over plastic molds until maturity. Thereby creating no wood waste. This process can take up to eight years to mature.

2006 Full Grown started planting trees to grow furniture.  On a 2.5 acre field around 3,000 trees have been planted with production getting underway in late 2011.

Early in 2015 the first prototype chair was completed. This chair took five years to grow. Some lampshades 2012 batch were also recently completed in 2015.

Gavin Munro

Gavin Munro was born in Matlock England. He studied furniture design. He created driftwood furniture while in San Francisco. Munro's mother in-law allowed the first prototypes of chairs to be grown in her garden. He co-foundered Full Grown.

Full Grown in 2017

In a two-acre field north of Derby Full Grown is currently tending 400 trees. They are only making 50 or so pieces a year. The first batch was to be harvested in 2015    The lamps and mirror frames should be ready by late spring 2016. By mid 2017 the first chairs should be available. Most of the chairs have been pre-sold. With the chairs selling for a per-order price £2,500 each, a finished chair the price is £5,000. Light shades priced between £1,000 and £1,500 and Hexagon mirror frames £450. Bulk of the pre-orders are from outside the UK most in France and the US with some orders from London, Hong Kong, Germany and Spain. Thou they will need to have patience as the grown chairs may take as long as 10 years before they are grown, harvested and finished.

Full grown are using permaculture ideas to help with pest control and tending the field.

Design 
The chairs are based on 18th century "Shaker" with some mid-century Scandinavian design centering around the idea the function is intrinsic to usefulness. The chairs are grown upside down.

Exhibitions 
The National Craft Centre - Lincoln, 
Museum Boijmans Van Beuningen - Rotterdam, Netherlands  
Tutti Cortex gallery - Rotterdam, Netherlands 
Little Moreton Hall - Cheshire, UK - 
National Museum of Scotland - Edinburgh, UK Bought one of the willow chair prototype. Displayed at New design gallery (Permanent Collection)

Process of tree shaping
The trees are trained along pre-defined routes following a blue plastic mold. The growing tip is shaped and held in place with small plastic clasps. The trees are gently manipulated to create the exact shape of chairs, tables, mirror frames or lamps. You can't force the trees as a tortured branch dies back and will reshoot elsewhere. The shaping can be inch-by-inch over the span of a few years. One tree has been planted specifically to grow each piece. Some of the pieces use grafting as part of the design. This process of growing the piece take somewhere between 4–8 years. During this time a piece thickens and matures before being harvesting in the winter. Once seasoned over several months the pieces are planed, cleaned back and polished to show the wood grain.

Items growing/grown 
 Chairs
 Tables
 Lampshades
  Mirror frames

Tree types 
Gavin Munro company Full Grown uses the following kinds of trees:
They mainly use willow as it grows fast and is relatively easy to work with. They like the idea of offering other varieties such as cherry, oak and a personal choice of ash. Partly to give a range of choice for customers and also to spread the risk of disease. Ash is easily prone to getting fungal disease and die back."

To grow a finished chair takes about four to five years with willow. It can take nine or more years to grow a chair in oak.

 Ash
 Willow 
 Oak
Sessile oak
Red oak
 Sycamore
 Crab apple
 Hazel

See also

References

British furniture makers
Forestry in the United Kingdom